William O'Halloran may refer to:
 William O'Halloran (trade unionist), pioneer of trade unionism in Galway, Ireland
 William O'Halloran (cricketer), Australian cricketer
 William Littlejohn O'Halloran, British Army officer and public servant in South Australia